Sallar was the fifteenth Shah of Shirvan. He was the uncle and successor of Bukhtnassar. Sallar was married to an unnamed daughter of Abu-l-Aswar Shavur I bin al-Fadl I.

Reign 
Sallar was one of youngest sons of Yazid III. In 1049, Sallar rebelled against his nephew Bukhtnassar; he repelled him from Shamakhi, and thereafter had him captured and killed near Baylaqan. In 1053, Sallar captured the Malu castle from pagans and then had it rebuilt. He later died on 20 February 1063, and was succeeded by his son Fariburz I.

References

Sources

1063 deaths
Year of birth unknown
11th-century rulers in Asia
11th-century Iranian people